The 2020 Massachusetts general election was held on November 3, 2020, throughout Massachusetts. Primary elections were held on September 1, 2020.

At the federal level, all nine seats in the United States House of Representatives were contested. Also contested was the United States Senate seat held by Ed Markey.

At the state level, all seats in the Massachusetts General Court (state legislature) were contested.

To vote by mail, registered Massachusetts voters had to request a ballot by October 30, 2020. As of early October some 504,043 voters had requested mail ballots.

Federal offices

U.S. President

U.S. Senate

U.S. House

State offices

General Court 

All seats in the State legislature, the General Court, were up for election.

Ballot measures 

Two ballot measures appeared on the 2020 ballot. Question 1 is concerned with access to an automobile's Mechanical data. It would force all automakers starting with model year 2022 to release all relevant mechanical data for any automobile sold in the state. Question 2 would establish a ranked choice voting system for most state and federal primaries and general elections.

As of April 2020, four measures (19-06, 19-10, 19-11, and 19-14) had achieved the required number of initial signatures and were pending in the Massachusetts General Court. The measures could be passed by the legislature before May 5, 2020, or if that failed to happen, petitioners were required collect an additional 13,347 signatures in support of each measure to be placed on the ballot. Due to the COVID-19 pandemic and the effects of social distancing on in-person signature collection, a lawsuit to allow for electronic signatures in support of ballot initiatives was raised with the Massachusetts Supreme Judicial Court. In late April, a court judgement to allow for electronic signatures was agreed to by Massachusetts Secretary of the Commonwealth William F. Galvin and supporters of the four measures. In early July, supporters of two of the four measures (19-06 and 19-10) announced that they had submitted a sufficient number of signatures to qualify for the ballot. Galvin certified both measures to appear on the 2020 ballot.

Several measures were not certified to circulate because they went against Massachusetts law on ballot measures. Others were cleared for circulation but did not collect enough initial signatures for the December 4, 2019 deadline.

Despite reaching a sufficient number of signatures in the first round, supporters of two measures (19-11 and 19-14) failed to collect the necessary number of signatures in the second round. By early July both initiatives had "effectively dropped their 2020 efforts".

See also 
 Political parties and political designations in Massachusetts
Massachusetts Democratic Party
 Massachusetts Republican Party
 Green Rainbow Party
 Massachusetts Libertarian Party

References

Further reading

External links

 Ballotpedia. Massachusetts elections, 2020.
 
 
 
 
 
  (State affiliate of the U.S. League of Women Voters)
 

 
Massachusetts